Larry James Lucas was a Democratic former member of the South Dakota House of Representatives, representing the 26A district since 2007. He previously served from 1991 through 2000.

External links
South Dakota Legislature - Larry Lucas official SD House website

Project Vote Smart - Representative Larry James Lucas (SD) profile
Follow the Money - Larry J Lucas
2008 2006 campaign contributions

Democratic Party members of the South Dakota House of Representatives
1951 births
Living people
South Dakota State University alumni
People from Platte, South Dakota
People from Mission, South Dakota